Igor may refer to:

People
 Igor (given name), an East Slavic given name and a list of people with the name
 Mighty Igor (1931–2002), former American professional wrestler
 Igor Volkoff, a professional wrestler from NWA All-Star Wrestling
 Igorrr, (born 1984) a French musician

Fictional characters
 Igor (character), a stock character
 Igor Karkaroff, character in the Harry Potter series
 Igor, the eagle in Count Duckula
 Igor, the first enemy character in fighting game Human Killing Machine
 Igor, a baboon with shape-shifting powers in Marvel comics (see List of fictional monkeys)
 Igor, a reoccurring character in the Persona series
 Igor, a character in Young Frankenstein
 Igor Nevsky, an assassin in Air Force One (film)

Arts, entertainment, and media
 Igor (album), a 2019 album by Tyler, The Creator
 Igor (film), a 2008 American animated film
 Igor: Objective Uikokahonia, a 1994 Spanish MS-DOS PC video game released

Computing
 Igor Engraver, a music notation computer program
 IGOR Pro, a computer program for scientific data analysis

Other uses
 Igor (crater), a tiny crater in the Mare Imbrium region of the Moon
 Igor (walrus), a walrus that lived in the Dolfinarium Harderwijk
 Igor Naming Agency, an American naming agency
 Hurricane Igor, a 2010 Atlantic storm